Rasmus Rissanen (born July 13, 1991) is a Finnish professional ice hockey defenceman. He is currently under contract with Örebro HK in the Swedish Hockey League (SHL). Rissanen was selected by the Carolina Hurricanes in the 6th round (178th overall) of the 2009 NHL Entry Draft.

Playing career
Rissanen played youth hockey in his native Finland with KalPa before leaving to play major junior hockey in the Western Hockey League (WHL) with the Everett Silvertips.

On April 4, 2011, the Carolina Hurricanes of the National Hockey League signed Rissanen to a three-year, entry-level contract, and he made his professional debut with the Charlotte Checkers of the American Hockey League near the end of the 2010–11 season.

In his fourth full professional season in 2014–15 season, Rissanen was finally recalled from the Checkers and made his NHL debut with the Hurricanes in a 3–1 defeat to the Minnesota Wild on March 6, 2015. During his seven-year stint in North America, he played a total of six games in the NHL, 294 in the AHL and 139 in the WHL.

After 5 seasons within the Hurricanes organization and unable to solidify an NHL role, Rissanen opted to return to his native Finland, signing with Jokerit, a member of the Kontinental Hockey League (KHL), on May 2, 2016.

Rissanen played two seasons in the KHL, before leaving Jokerit at the conclusion of his contract and signing a two-year deal with Swedish outfit, Örebro HK of the SHL, on June 5, 2018.

Career statistics

Regular season and playoffs

International

References

External links

1991 births
Living people
Carolina Hurricanes draft picks
Carolina Hurricanes players
Charlotte Checkers (2010–) players
Everett Silvertips players
Finnish expatriate ice hockey players in the United States
Finnish ice hockey defencemen
Jokerit players
Örebro HK players
People from Kuopio
Sportspeople from North Savo